The Buka Island mosaic-tailed rat or Buka Island melomys (Melomys spechti) is a species of rat in Oceania.

It is endemic to Buka Island, in the Autonomous Region of Bougainville in northeastern Papua New Guinea.

References

Melomys
Rat, Buka Island mosaic-tailed
Endemic fauna of Papua New Guinea
Rat, Buka Island mosaic-tailed
Buka, Papua New Guinea
Mammals described in 1990
Taxa named by Tim Flannery